Horsetail Falls is a waterfall in the Sierra Nevada mountain range, to the west of Lake Tahoe in the Desolation Wilderness of El Dorado County, California, United States.  It falls in stages for nearly 500ft (150 m). It can be reached by hiking north out of the Twin Bridges trailhead on U.S. Route 50. There is a forest service parking area designated to the area. 

References

External links 

Routes, Waypoints, and Maps

Lake Tahoe
Waterfalls of the Sierra Nevada (United States)
Waterfalls of California
Landforms of El Dorado County, California
Eldorado National Forest
Tourist attractions in El Dorado County, California